Garry Harcourt Tregidga is a Cornish academic, director of the Institute of Cornish Studies at the University of Exeter's Penryn Campus in Cornwall, UK, and editor of the journal Cornish Studies.

He lives in Bugle, near St Austell, and was named as a Bard of the Cornish Gorsedh for services to Cornish history, taking the name  "Map Rosvean" - "Son of Rosevean". 

Tregidga took both his MPhil and PhD degrees with the University of Exeter. In October 1997, he was appointed Assistant Director of the Institute of Cornish Studies. He has published articles on many themes related to Cornwall and is the author of The Liberal Party in South West Britain since 1918: Political Decline, Dormancy and Rebirth (2000), and is a co-author of Mebyon Kernow and Cornish Nationalism (2003). 

In 1998 he founded the Cornish History Network, followed in 2000 by the Cornish Audio-Visual Archive (CAVA) which aims to document the oral history and visual culture of Cornwall.

He stood as a Mebyon Kernow candidate for the Bugle division on Cornwall Council in the 2017 local elections, coming second. He also stood in the 2021 Cornwall Council elections for the Roche and Bugle division under Mebyon Kernow. placing second, behind The Conservative Party candidate Peter Guest with a margin of 28% to 23%.

Publications

References

Education in Cornwall
Academics of the University of Exeter
Year of birth missing (living people)
Living people
British historians
Historians of Cornwall
Writers from Cornwall
Cornish culture
Cornish nationalists
Bards of Gorsedh Kernow